Jagrantia is a monotypic genus of flowering plants belonging to the family Bromeliaceae. It only contains one species, Jagrantia monstrum.

Its native range is south-eastern Nicaragua to northern Ecuador. It is found in the countries of Colombia, Costa Rica, Ecuador, Nicaragua and Panamá.

The genus name of Jagrantia is in honour of Jason Randall Grant (b. 1969), an American botanist in Neuchâtel, Switzerland and specialist in Bromeliaceae. The Latin specific epithet of monstrum refers to monstrum meaning "a malfunctioning of nature". The word monster is derived from this term. It was first described and published in Phytotaxa Vol.279 on pages 51-52 in 2016.

References

Tillandsioideae
Plants described in 2016
Flora of western South America
Flora of Central America